The Céou is a  long river in the Lot and Dordogne départements, southwestern France. It flows generally northwest.

Communes along its course
This list is ordered from source to mouth: 
Lot: Séniergues, Montfaucon, Vaillac, Beaumat, Frayssinet, Saint-Chamarand, Saint-Germain-du-Bel-Air, Concorès, Dégagnac, Gourdon, Léobard, Salviac
Dordogne: Saint-Aubin-de-Nabirat, Florimont-Gaumier, Saint-Martial-de-Nabirat, Bouzic, Daglan, Cénac-et-Saint-Julien, Saint-Cybranet, Castelnaud-la-Chapelle

References

Rivers of France
Rivers of Dordogne
Rivers of Lot (department)
Rivers of Occitania (administrative region)